Haibach may refer to the following places:

in Bavaria, Germany:
Haibach, Lower Franconia, in the district of Aschaffenburg
Haibach, Lower Bavaria, in the district Straubing-Bogen 
in Upper Austria, Austria:
Haibach ob der Donau, in the district of Eferding
Haibach im Mühlkreis, in the district Urfahr-Umgebung